Charlton Halt railway station may refer to:

 Charlton Halt railway station (Oxfordshire)
 Charlton Halt railway station (Bristol)